The Armed Forces of the Republic of Croatia is the military service of Croatia.

The President is the Armed Forces Commander-in-Chief, and exercises administrative powers in times of war by giving orders to the chief of staff, while administration and defence policy execution in peacetime is carried out by the Government through the Ministry of Defence. This unified institution consists of land, sea, and air branches referred to as:

 Croatian Army (Hrvatska kopnena vojska - HKoV)
 Croatian Navy (Hrvatska ratna mornarica - HRM)
 Croatian Air Force (Hrvatsko ratno zrakoplovstvo - HRZ)

The Croatian Armed Forces are charged with protecting the Republic as well as supporting international peacekeeping efforts, when mandated by the NATO, United Nations and/or European Union.

The Army has 650 AFVs, around 150 pieces of artillery, 100 MLRSs, around 75 tanks, and 25 SPGs. The Air Force has 12 MiG-21 jet fighters, 10 combat-transport Mi-171 and 16 OH-58 attack helicopters. The Navy has 30 ships, out of which five 60-80 metre fast attack craft are used in offensive capabilities.

Strength
In 2020, Armed Forces had 15,605 members, of which 14,325 were active military personnel and 1,280 civil servants. Of the 14,506 active military personnel, 3,033 were officers, 5,549 non-commissioned officers, 5,214 soldiers, 529 military specialists, 307 civil servants and 973 other employees.

Total available male manpower aged 16–49 numbers 1,035,712, of which 771,323 are technically fit for military service. Male citizens are now no longer subject to compulsory military service since January 1, 2008. However, the last generation of 2007 servicemen was also absolved of compulsory service by an act from then Minister of Defence Berislav Rončević.

Budget
The Croatian military budget for the past 6–7 years was kept below 2% of GDP, a vast difference from the 1990s when defence expenditure represented a major stake in Croatian budgetary expenditure due to the Croatian War of Independence. For example, 1995 Croatian defence budget stood at 12.4 billion Croatian Kuna or just over 10% of GDP, which was also the highest defence expenditure rate ever. In late 2019, Croatian Government issued revised defence expenditure which will see country increase defence expenditure to meet 2% NATO target by 2020, with 2019 and 2020 defence budgets seeing immediate revisions and increases to meet new spending plan. Defence expenditure in 2024 therefore based on current projections could reach 9.4 billion kuna or around 2% NATO requirement.

Defence expenditures in recent years (source Croatian MOD);

(*) - projected expenditure 
(**) - proposed expenditure 
Although the budget has been decreased in percentage of BDP from year to year, overall budget increased and the Croatian Armed Forces were able to maintain military readiness and to participate in major NATO exercises in Croatia and overseas. Downsizing of the armed forces has allowed for more funds to be allocated to modernization over the past few years with an average of 1.6 billion HRK spent on modernization, infrastructure and construction of new facilities.

A $3 billion modernization plan was proposed by the then Prime Minister Ivica Račan of the SDP led government in 2003., with planned modernization starting in 2006. and ending in 2015.. However it has been delayed due to the subsequent economic recession that has cost the Croatian MOD several billion HRK since 2006.. A new plan under former Prime Minister Zoran Milanović should define exactly how and what the Croatian armed forces should look like by 2023.. A defense white paper was published in 2015 with emphasis placed on modernization of the Army.

Dr. Franjo Tuđman Military Academy

The Dr. Franjo Tuđman Military Academy, named after Franjo Tuđman, acts as a school of higher learning responsible for training and educating future generations of military personnel. 
The academy consists of several schools including "Ban Josip Jelačić", "Blago Zadro", "Katarina Zrinska", the Officers Academy, and a school for non commissioned officers. The academy has 300 full-time staff and is the only military academy in Croatia. Each year also 100–120 foreign nationals attend the academy.

Commander
The Commander-in-Chief of all Croatian armed forces in peace and war is the President of the Republic. The Commander-in-Chief prescribes the organisation of the Croatian Armed Forces at the proposal of the Chief of General Staff, with consent of the Minister of Defence.

The Armed Forces consist of peacetime and wartime components. The peacetime component is composed of the active military officers, civil servants and employees in the Croatian Armed Forces, cadets, and conscripts serving a 6-month national service and reservists when on military exercise. The wartime component of the Armed Forces includes all other reservists.

The General Staff is part of the Ministry of Defence in charge of commanding, training and use of the Armed Forces. It also has a number of units under its direct command, including the Special Operations Battalion, Honour Guard Battalion and several others.

In peace, the Commander-in-Chief exercises his command through the Minister of Defence. In war and in cases where the Minister of Defence is not fulfilling his orders, the Commander-in-Chief exercises his command directly through the General Staff Commander.

The Croatian Parliament exercises democratic control over the Armed Forces by adopting defence strategy, defence budget, and defence laws.

Special Forces Command

Special Forces Command (Zapovjedništvo specijalnih snaga, ZSS) was established in February 2015, succeeding the Special Operations Battalion (Croatia), in accordance with the Long-term Development Plan of the Croatian Armed Forces in the period 2015–2024. The command staff is composed of the members who served in the special units, guards brigades and reconnaissance units of the Croatian Armed Forces. The main mission of the Special Forces Command is to ensure combat readiness of the special forces in the protection of the territorial integrity, sovereignty and independence of the Republic of Croatia, as well as for the participation in NATO-led operations. Colonel Perica Turalija is the current commanding officer of the command.

The Croatian General Staff exercises direct command over the battalion which thus elevates the unit to strategic level deployment for quicker reaction and overall better and faster response to tactical and strategic situations. Also, this means that members of all three branches of the Croatian armed forces can apply for selection.

Other special operations units are the Military Intelligence Battalion (Vojno-obavještajna bojna, VOB) and Special Military Police Company (Satnija specijalne vojne policije, SS VP).

The duties of an Honor Guard are performed by the Honor Guard Battalion (Počasno zaštitna bojna), located at Zagreb in the Tuškanac military base.

Projects
A long term modernization plan for 2015–2024 has been published outlining overall goals and is available for download (102 pages) at the Ministry of Defense of Croatia website. According to earlier reports from the government, the Croatian Armed Forces are set to receive vitally needed new equipment.

Army

 Modernisation of M-84A and M-84A4 Snajper MBTs and upgrade to M-84D standard. The programme is at a standstill and is unlikely to receive further funding due to high costs involved of nearly 20 million kuna per tank, but overhaul of existing fleet might be completed by the end of 2017 at cost of 120 million kuna (24 vehicles already overhauled at cost of 60 million kuna).
The Croatian Army is looking at replacing 128 M80A IFV in its inventory, Croatian Army requires 108 Vehicles, 88 Infantry combat vehicles, 4 Driver training vehicles, 8 Armoured Ambulance vehicles and 8 command vehicles. It's announced that M2 Bradley in M2A2 ODS variant was chosen, 60 + 24 vehicles for spare parts will be delivered in 2020 as a donation from United States and modernised in Croatia by BAE Systems.In 2022 Croatia bought 89 M2 Bradley Vehicles. 
Talks are being held with US and German governments on possible purchase of M270 Multiple Launch Rocket System, Croatian requirements call for initially 8 systems to form a two battery teams at independent Artillery regiment, with potential for further 16 systems to equip 2 active brigades for total of 24 systems + simulators and training aids. Number of systems Croatian Army might purchase will solely depend on price of the entire purchase and delivery dates, Croatian Defence budget has set aside some 200 million kuna or $32 million for this programme, although it is likely said systems might be donated by the US for symbolic price in turn Croatian MOD paying only VAT.
The initial order of 8 Elbit UT30Mk2 CRO unmanned turrets for Patria AMV, armed with 30mm gun and Spike launchers in 2019, value of the contract: $14.9 million.
Scores of smaller programmes, communication equipment, night vision capability, electronic sensors, NBC equipment, battlefield management systems and modernisation of artillery systems with new sights and electronic fire control systems are planned.
Procurement of advanced short to medium range NATO SAM system. As of now no real funding has been mentioned other than the statement that this project is a priority and current requirements call for one battery. Estimated value – $50–70 million for new system. Alternately a second-hand system might be obtained as a donation by the United States, in which case only the VAT cost will be incurred.
 Procurement of short range SAM systems – no indication of what system or specifications other than a requirement for a range of up to 10 km. Intent is for up to 3 batteries with one battery being ready by 2015/6. Total funding for this programme has not been made public yet, but similar western systems tend to be in range of $17–20 million per battery.

Air Force

 Croatia has a requirement for a small number of fighter aircraft (6-12) to replace the MiG-21. A plan to acquire ex-Israeli F-16C/Ds was cancelled in January 2019 after the United States refused to allow Israel to sell the aircraft. The Croatian interdepartmental commission for the procurement of multi-purpose combat aircraft has sent requests for proposals (RFP) for two new fighter types (F-16 Block 70/72 and JAS-39C/D) and five second hand fighters types (F-16AM/BM, F-16C/D, F-16 Barak, Eurofighter Typhoon and Dassault Rafale). Croatia's government said it expects to receive the new offers by May and make the decision by August 2020. In 2021 Croatia bought 12 used Dassault Rafale from France.
 Purchase of up to 10–12 transport helicopters (after 2020) – replacing older Mi-8. With the Government indicating that purchase of 10 new helicopters might be the only option after 2020. Most likely candidate is the UH-60M since the United States donated two new helicopters and Croatia decided to purchase additional two. Programme cost: 2.5 billion kuna.

Navy
Navy plans are still being worked on but present plans call for a moderate expansion of the naval force.

 5 new patrol boats, locally built, 42 metres in length. Cost of programme 750 million kuna, or 375 million for first 5 ships, first to enter service in 2018.
 2 new corvettes – 80–125 metres in length. Cost of programme 3.0 billion kuna. Programme is at standstill due to lack of funds, feasible only after 2020. 
 Overhaul of existing 2 Kralj class fast attack crafts, including new engines. Cost of programme – 40 million kuna.
 Overhaul of sea radar Falcon 2 Enhanced Peregrine – programme is being financed by US government at estimated cost of $8 million.
 Possible purchase of 2nd minesweeper before 2020; although there are only indications that this might happen if funds can be allocated. Programme cost – 80 million kuna.

Arms exports

As a small country, Croatia has a relatively well developed arms industry that is highly competitive internationally with significant annual arms exports. In 2012, Croatia managed to export nearly €120 million. However it has been reported in The New York Times that Croatia has been arming Syrian rebels with Croatian manufactured arms used during the Homeland War, arms Croatia no longer uses due to their obsolescence. Nevertheless, these arms played a crucial role in some significant rebel gains during 2012. As a result of these arms sales into this volatile region the Croatian government ordered the immediate withdrawal of the Croatian UN Golan Heights contingent to avoid their being targeted in retaliation.

In 2013 Croatia exported €143 million worth of arms, however it is not clear if this also includes $36.5 million worth of arms Croatia exported to Jordan for Syrian rebels. Croatia was the top supplier of arms to Syrian rebels in 2013, but much of it through illicit channels without Croatian government approval or knowledge. Most of these arms were exported via Jordan.

In 2014 Croatian arms exports reached 1.5 bn HRK (Croatian kuna) or €200 million or $257 million, the majority of exports being to NATO allies and Australia. In late 2014 the Croatian Defence Minister announced a major export deal to Iraq including the State of Kurdistan. This agreement includes the sale of 20,000 VHS Rifles, 150,000 complete sets of uniforms, helmets and associated equipment valued at €100 million.
Croatian arms exports are growing steadily at 10–15% year-on-year and were expected to reach 1.75 billion HRK in 2015 or around €230 million, although much of the equipment exported is non-lethal. Croatian firms are well positioned on some major arms tenders in the Middle East, supplying complex military hardware such as the Patria AMV incorporating a newly developed 30mm overhead weapon station (valued at €1.25 million each) and said vehicles valued at €1.75 million. Kuwait, the UAE, and Saudi Arabia have been mentioned as potential customers, although no concrete contracts have been signed so far. Croatian firms are participating in Kuwaiti and UAE tenders for next-generation APC programmes, each valued at billions of euros.

Croatian arms exports have grown steadily for the better part of this decade and have reached €325 million per year, placing Croatia in the top 10 arms exporters within NATO, behind the US, Germany, UK, France, Netherlands, Spain, Italy, Poland and Norway. The vast majority of these exports are to NATO partners such as the US, Norway, Australia, Canada, France. Croatia granted €5.75 billion in export licenses in 2016 and 2017; however, only a fraction of this sum has materialised in actual arms exports.

International cooperation
On April 1, 2009 Croatia joined NATO and on July 1, 2013, it became the 28th member of the European Union. The Croatian Armed Forces participate in many of the (military) aspects of both organisations as well as actively participating in many United Nations peacekeeping operations worldwide.

Gallery

See also

 Croatian military ranks
 Croatian War of Independence
 List of Croatian soldiers
 Military history of Croatia
 Military Security and Intelligence Agency
 Croatian Ministry of Defence
 Orders, decorations, and medals of Croatia

Citations

References

External links

 Croatian Armed Forces Official website
 Croatian Forces International Volunteers Association official website
 Croatian Military Academy official website
  - Defense planning and procurement.
  - long term planning and long term defense strategy
 Photos BSD
 CROMIL - Croatian military's official English-language magazine

 
Permanent Structured Cooperation